Avitabatrachus uliana is the only species discovered so far in the extinct genus Avitabatrachus, a genus of prehistoric frogs that lived in the Middle Cretaceous. Fossils of A. uliana were found in the Candeleros Formation of northwestern Patagonia in Argentina. It was properly described in 2000 and was then concluded to be most closely related to Pipidae frogs. Hence, it was included in Pipimorpha.

Etymology
The genus name, Avitabatrachus, is derived from the Greek words avita meaning "ancient" and batrachos meaning "frog", so called because it is the oldest record of pipids in South America. The species is named after Miguel Uliana.

See also 
 Prehistoric amphibian

References 

Mesobatrachia
Prehistoric amphibian genera
Cretaceous frogs
Cenomanian life
Late Cretaceous animals of South America
Cretaceous amphibians of South America
Cretaceous Argentina
Fossils of Argentina
Candeleros Formation
Fossil taxa described in 2000